Gerolamo is a given name. Notable people with the name include:

Gerolamo Cardano (1501–1576), Italian Renaissance mathematician, physician, astrologer and gambler
Gerolamo Emiliani (1486–1537), Italian humanitarian, founder of the Somaschi Fathers, and saint
Gerolamo Giovenone (1486–1555), Italian painter of the early Renaissance period mainly in Milan
Gerolamo Marquese d' Andrea (1812–1868), Italian Cardinal
Gerolamo Olgiati (1453–1477), government official in Milan and assassin of Galeazzo Maria Sforza, the Duke of Milan
Gerolamo Quaglia (born 1902), Italian wrestler and Olympic medalist in Greco-Roman wrestling
Gerolamo Sersale (1584–1654), Italian Jesuit astronomer and selenographer
Gerolamo Theodoli (1677–1766), Italian nobleman and architect, best known for designing the Teatro Argentina in Rome

See also
Girolamo